
Year 238 BC was a year of the pre-Julian Roman calendar. At the time it was known as the Year of the Consulship of Gracchus and Falto (or, less frequently, year 516 Ab urbe condita). The denomination 238 BC for this year has been used since the early medieval period, when the Anno Domini calendar era became the prevalent method in Europe for naming years.

Events 
 By place 
 Carthage 
 Hamilcar Barca strikes at the supply lines of the mercenary army besieging Carthage, forcing them to cease the siege of the city. He then fights a series of running engagements with the mercenary armies, keeping them off balance. Hamilcar manages to force the mercenary armies into a box canyon in the Battle of "The Saw". The mercenaries are besieged in the canyon.
 The mercenary army, under the leadership of Spendius, attempts to fight its way out of the siege but is totally defeated by the Carthaginian forces led by Hamilcar Barca. After the battle, Hamilcar executes some 40,000 rebel mercenaries.
 Hamilcar's armies capture a number of rebel Libyan cities. The Libyan settlements that have rebelled surrender to Carthage, with the exception of Utica and Hippacritae.
 Hamilcar and another Carthaginian general, Hannibal, besiege Mathos' mercenary army at Tunis and crucify the captured mercenary leaders in sight of the mercenary battlements.
 Mathos exploits a weakness in Hannibal's defenses and launches an attack against his army, capturing Hannibal and several other high ranking Carthaginians. The mercenaries then crucify the captured Carthaginian leaders.
 Carthaginian reinforcements led by Hanno the Great join the battle. They defeat Mathos' mercenary forces and Mathos is captured.
 The Carthaginian armies besiege and capture Utica and Hippacritae. This ends the Carthaginian civil war.
 The Romans declare war on the Carthaginians over which state controls Sardinia. However, Carthage defers to Rome rather than enter yet another war and gives up any claim to Sardinia.

 Egypt 
 The Decree of Canopus, also called "Table of Tanis", is a memorial stone promulgated by an assemblage of priests in honour of Ptolemy III Euergetes and his consort Berenice. The decree, written in Greek, demotic, and hieroglyphs is an ancient bilingual Egyptian decree that provides a key for deciphering hieroglyphic and the simpler demotic scripts.

 Persia 
 Arsaces, chief of an Iranian nomad tribe, the Parni, invades and conquers Parthia killing, in the process, the local ruler Andragoras.
Asia Minor

 A joint Seleucid-Galatian invasion of Pergamon is defeated at the Battle of Aphrodisium 

 China 
 Ying Zheng, having reached adulthood, celebrates his capping ceremony as the king of Qin. 
 Ying Zheng and Prime Minister Lü Buwei crush the rebellion of Lao Ai. Lao Ai is executed.

Births 
 Masinissa, king of Numidia (approximate date)
 Philip V, king (basileus) of Macedonia (d. 179 BC)

Deaths 
 Andragoras, Seleucid governor (satrap) of Parthia
 Autaritus, Gallic mercenary leader 
 Chunshen, Chinese nobleman
 Hannibal, Carthaginian general
 Kaolie of Chu, Chinese king of the Chu State
 Lao Ai, Chinese eunuch and official
 Xun Zi, Chinese philosopher (approximate date)

References